The 2018–19 Virginia Cavaliers men's basketball team represented the University of Virginia during the 2018–19 NCAA Division I men's basketball season. The team was led by head coach Tony Bennett in his tenth year, and played their home games at John Paul Jones Arena in Charlottesville, Virginia as members of the Atlantic Coast Conference.

UVA opened the season with consecutive wins over ranked Big Ten teams, No. 25 Wisconsin (Battle 4 Atlantis) and No. 24 Maryland (ACC–Big Ten Challenge), the latter of which improved Bennett's record in the Challenge to 8–2. An unheralded two-star recruit, 5'9" Kihei Clark from Los Angeles, California, started both games as a true freshman. The team then started the season 16–0 before falling to No. 1 Duke, 72–70. The game was just the fourth in college basketball history between two teams both ranked No. 1, as the No. 4 Cavaliers were voted atop the Coaches Poll before the loss. After a 16–2 ACC record, Virginia won a share of their fourth ACC regular season title in the past six years.

In the ACC tournament, the Cavaliers defeated NC State 76–56, before falling to Florida State in the conference semifinals.  Virginia was then awarded the No. 1 seed in the South region and dispatched Gardner-Webb and Oklahoma by healthy margins in the first two rounds in Columbia, South Carolina.  They advanced to a Sweet 16 matchup with Oregon and beat Oregon 53–49 to advance to their 2nd Elite 8 under Bennett. In the Elite Eight, they beat Purdue 80–75 in overtime to secure a trip to their first Final Four since 1984. On April 6, 2019, they defeated Auburn in their Final Four matchup by a score of 63–62 on 3 last-second free throws by Kyle Guy, cementing the program's first ever trip to the national championship game. On April 8, 2019, Virginia beat Texas Tech 85–77 in overtime, winning its first national championship.

Previous season
Unranked by the AP in the preseason poll, the Cavaliers surprisingly finished the 2017–18 season 31–3, and 17–1 in ACC play to win both ACC Regular Season and tournament titles. The Cavaliers received an automatic bid to the NCAA tournament as the No. 1 seed in the South region, where they were upset by No. 16 UMBC in the first round. This was the first and only time thus far in Men's NCAA tournament history that a No. 1 seed was upset by a No. 16 seed.

Offseason
Virginia's offseason started on the night of March 16, 2018, and ended on the evening of November 6, 2018.

The Cavaliers lost five players and gained four.

Departures

Incoming transfers

2018 recruiting class

Roster

Players

Coaching staff

Depth Chart

Schedule and results 

Source:

|-
!colspan=12 style=""| Non-conference regular season

|-
!colspan=12 style=""| ACC Regular Season

|-
!colspan=12 style=""| ACC Tournament

|-
!colspan=12 style=""| NCAA tournament

Game summaries

Towson Tigers vs Virginia Cavaliers

Rankings

*AP does not release post-NCAA Tournament rankings^Coaches did not release a Week 2 poll.

References

Notes 

Virginia Cavaliers men's basketball seasons
Virginia
Virginia Cavaliers men's basketball
Virginia Cavaliers men's basketball team
Virginia
NCAA Division I men's basketball tournament Final Four seasons
NCAA Division I men's basketball tournament championship seasons